
Year 240 (CCXL) was a leap year starting on Wednesday (link will display the full calendar) of the Julian calendar. At the time, it was known as the Year of the Consulship of Sabinus and Venustus (or, less frequently, year 993 Ab urbe condita). The denomination 240 for this year has been used since the early medieval period, when the Anno Domini calendar era became the prevalent method in Europe for naming years.

Events 
 By place 
 Roman Empire 
 The Roman Empire is threatened on several fronts at the same time.  Africa revolts and tribes in northwest Germania, under the name of the Franks, are raiding the Rhine frontier.

 Persia 
 April 12 – Prince Shapur I becomes co-ruler of the Sasanian Empire with his father King Ardashir I.
 Siege of Hatra: The Sasanians besiege the capital of the Kingdom of Hatra ruled by Sanatruq II.

 India 
 Maharaja Sri-Gupta becomes ruler of the Gupta Empire (approximate date).

 By topic 
 Religion 
 Mani, a young mystic of Ctesiphon, proclaims himself a prophet at the court of Ardashir I. He preaches his doctrine, Manichaeism, throughout the Sassanid Empire.

Births 
 Lucian of Antioch, Syrian theologian and martyr (d. 312)
 Sporus of Nicaea, Greek mathematician (approximate date)
 Zenobia, queen of the Palmyrene Empire (d. 274)

Deaths 
 Ammonius Saccas, Neoplatonic philosopher (approximate date)
 Herodian of Antioch, Roman historian and writer (b. 170)
 Huang Quan (or Gongheng), Chinese general

References